Jamali (also Romanized as Jamālī; also known as Jamādī) is a village in Kuh Mareh Sorkhi Rural District, Arzhan District, Shiraz County, Fars Province, Iran. At the 2006 census, its population was 30, in 7 families.

References 

Populated places in Shiraz County